Recurring means occurring repeatedly and can refer to several different things:

Mathematics and finance 
Recurring expense, an ongoing (continual) expenditure
Repeating decimal, or recurring decimal, a real number in the decimal numeral system in which a sequence of digits repeats infinitely
Curiously recurring template pattern (CRTP), a software design pattern

Processes 
Recursion, the process of repeating items in a self-similar way
Recurring dream, a dream that someone repeatedly experiences over an extended period

Television 
Recurring character, a character, usually on a television series, that appears from time to time and may grow into a larger role
Recurring status, condition whereby a soap opera actor may be used for extended period without being under contract

Other uses 
Recurring (album), a 1991 album by the British psychedelic-rock group, Spacemen 3

See also